Nebrarctia hunza is a moth of the family Erebidae. It was described by Josef J. de Freina in 1997. It is found in northern Pakistan.

References

 

Spilosomina
Moths described in 1997